Thompson Park, is an urban park designed by John Charles Olmsted (The nephew and adopted son of Frederick Law Olmsted, who designed Central Park) located in Watertown, New York. It was donated to the city by industrialist John C. Thompson in 1916.

The park features a zoo and a 18 hole golf club  as well as a monument to soldiers of the 10th Mountain Division. The monument was designed, built and unveiled on July 1, 2016 by the North Country community.

History 
Thompson Park was donated to Watertown, New York in 1916. A playground began construction in November 2016   which was completed on May 23, 2017, with the ribbon cutting ceremony being held on June 5, 2017. The park & Zoo was closed down due to Covid-19 on March 19, 2020,  and was reopened again on June 27, 2020.

Zoo 
The park is the location of "Zoo New York", a zoo located North-West of the Parks entrance. It was founded in 1920, and contains animals mostly native to Northern New York, with a Roosevelt Elk, a Bobcat, a Golden Eagle, a Canada Lynx, a Mountain Lion, a Snowy Owl, a Bald Eagle, Black Bears, Otters, etc. The Zoo also features a playground, which was unveiled on October 3, 2019.

References

External links 

 Thompson Park Zoo

Parks in New York (state)
Zoos in New York (state)
Parks containing Zoos in new york (state)
Parks in Jefferson County, New York
Landforms of Watertown, New York